Pfizer Inc. is an American multinational pharmaceutical and biotechnology corporation headquartered on 42nd Street in Manhattan, New York City. The company was established in 1849 in New York by two German entrepreneurs, Charles Pfizer (1824–1906) and his cousin Charles F. Erhart (1821–1891).

Pfizer develops and produces medicines and vaccines for immunology, oncology, cardiology, endocrinology, and neurology. The company's largest products by sales are the Pfizer–BioNTech COVID-19 vaccine ($37 billion in 2022 revenues), Nirmatrelvir/ritonavir ($18 billion in 2022 revenues), Apixaban ($6 billion in 2022 revenues), a pneumococcal conjugate vaccine ($6 billion in 2022 revenues), and Palbociclib ($5 billion in 2022 revenues). In 2022, 42% of the company's revenues came from the United States, 8% came from Japan, and 50% came from other countries.

Pfizer was a component of the Dow Jones Industrial Average stock market index from 2004 to August 2020. The company ranks 43rd on the Fortune 500 and 43rd on the Forbes Global 2000.

History

1849–1950: Early history 
Pfizer was founded in 1849 by Charles Pfizer and Charles F. Erhart, two cousins who had immigrated to the United States from Ludwigsburg, Germany, the year before. The business produced chemical compounds, and was headquartered on Bartlett Street in Williamsburgh, New York where they produced an antiparasitic called santonin. This was an immediate success, although it was production of citric acid that led to Pfizer's growth in the 1880s. Pfizer continued to buy property in the area (by now the Williamsburg district of the city of Brooklyn, New York and beginning in 1898, the City of Greater New York) to expand its lab and factory, retaining offices on Flushing Avenue until the 1960s; the Brooklyn plant ultimately closed in 2009. Following their success with citric acid, Pfizer (at the now-demolished 295 Washington Avenue) and Erhart (at 280 Washington Avenue) established their main residences in the nearby Clinton Hill district, known for its concentration of Gilded Age wealth. Pfizer spent summers in similarly exclusive Newport, Rhode Island where he died in 1906.

In 1881, Pfizer moved its administrative headquarters to 81 Maiden Lane in Manhattan, presaging the company's expansion to Chicago a year later. By 1906 sales exceeded $3million.

World War I caused a shortage of calcium citrate, which Pfizer imported from Italy for the manufacture of citric acid, and the company began a search for an alternative supply. Pfizer chemists learned of a fungus that ferments sugar to citric acid, and they were able to commercialize production of citric acid from this source in 1919. The company developed expertise in fermentation technology as a result. These skills were applied to the mass production of penicillin, an antibiotic, during World War II in response to the need to treat injured Allied soldiers.

On June 2, 1942, the company incorporated in Delaware.

1950–1980: Pivot to pharmaceutical research and global expansion 
Due to price declines for penicillin, Pfizer searched for new antibiotics with greater profit potential. Pfizer discovered oxytetracycline in 1950, and this changed the company from a manufacturer of fine chemicals to a research-based pharmaceutical company. Pfizer developed a drug discovery program focused on in vitro synthesis to augment its research in fermentation technology. In 1959, the company established an animal health division with a  farm and research facility in Terre Haute, Indiana.

By the 1950s, Pfizer had established offices in Belgium, Brazil, Canada, Cuba, Mexico, Panama, Puerto Rico, and the United Kingdom. In 1960, the company moved its medical research laboratory operations out of New York City to a new facility in Groton, Connecticut. In 1980, Pfizer launched Feldene (piroxicam), a prescription anti-inflammatory medication that became Pfizer's first product to reach $1billion in revenue.

In 1965, John Powers, Jr. became chief executive officer of the company, succeeding John McKeen.

As the area surrounding its Brooklyn plant fell into decline in the 1970s and 1980s, the company formed a public-private partnership with New York City that encompassed the construction of low- and middle-income housing, the refurbishment of apartment buildings for the homeless and the establishment of a charter school.

In 1972, Edmund T. Pratt Jr. became chief executive officer of the company, succeeding John Powers, Jr.

1980–2000: Development of Viagra, Zoloft, and Lipitor 
In 1981, the company received approval for Diflucan (fluconazole), the first oral treatment for severe fungal infections including candidiasis, blastomycosis, coccidiodomycosis, cryptococcosis, histoplasmosis, dermatophytosis, and pityriasis versicolor.

In 1986, Pfizer acquired the worldwide rights to Zithromax (azithromycin), a macrolide antibiotic that is recommended by the Infectious Disease Society of America as a first line treatment for certain cases of community-acquired pneumonia, from Pliva.

In 1989, Pfizer scientists Peter Dunn and Albert Wood created Viagra (sildenafil) for treating high blood pressure and angina, a chest pain associated with coronary artery disease. In 1991, it was patented in the United Kingdom as a heart medication. Early trials for the medication showed that it did not work for the treatment of heart disease, but volunteers in the clinical trials had increased erections several days after taking the drug. It was patented in the United States in 1996 and received approval by the Food and Drug Administration in March 1998. In December 1998, Pfizer hired Bob Dole as a spokesperson for the drug. The patents for Viagra expired in 2020.

In 1991, William C. Steere, Jr. became chief executive officer of the company, succeeding Edmund T. Pratt Jr.

In 1991 Pfizer also began marketing Zoloft (sertraline), an antidepressant of the selective serotonin reuptake inhibitor (SSRI) class developed nine years earlier by Pfizer chemists Kenneth Koe and Willard Welch. Sertraline is primarily prescribed for major depressive disorder in adult outpatients as well as obsessive-compulsive disorder, panic disorder, and social anxiety disorder in both adults and children. In 2005, the year before it became a generic drug, sales were over $3billion and over 100million people had been treated with the drug. The patent for Zoloft expired in the summer of 2006.

In 1996, Eisai, in partnership with Pfizer, received approval from the Food and Drug Administration for donepezil under the brand Aricept for treatment of Alzheimer's disease; Pfizer also received approval for Norvasc (amlodipine), an antihypertensive drug of the dihydropyridine calcium channel blocker class.

In 1997, the company entered into a co-marketing agreement with Warner–Lambert for Lipitor (atorvastatin), a statin for the treatment of hypercholesterolemia. Although atorvastatin was the fifth statin to be developed, clinical trials showed that atorvastatin caused a more dramatic reduction in low-density lipoprotein pattern C (LDL-C) than the other statin drugs. Upon its patent expiration in 2011, Lipitor was the best-selling drug ever, with approximately $125billion in sales over 14.5 years.

2000–2010: Further expansion 
In 2001, Henry McKinnell became chief executive officer of the company, replacing William C. Steere, Jr.

In 2002, The Bill & Melinda Gates Foundation purchased stock in Pfizer.

In 2004, the company received approval for Lyrica (pregabalin), an anticonvulsant and anxiolytic medication used to treat epilepsy, neuropathic pain, fibromyalgia, restless leg syndrome, and generalized anxiety disorder. The United States patent on Lyrica was challenged by generic manufacturers and was upheld in 2014, extending the expiration date to 2018. In 2016, the drug had sales of $4.2 billion.

In July 2006, Jeff Kindler was named chief executive officer of the company, replacing Henry McKinnell.

On December 3, 2006, Pfizer ceased development of torcetrapib, a drug that increases production of HDL, which reduces LDL thought to be correlated to heart disease. During a Phase III clinical trial involving 15,000 patients, more deaths than expected occurred in the group that took the medicine, and the mortality rate of patients taking the combination of torcetrapib and Lipitor (82 deaths during the study) was 60% higher than those taking Lipitor alone (52 deaths during the study). Lipitor alone was not implicated in the results, but Pfizer lost nearly $1billion developing the failed drug and its stock price dropped 11% on the day of the announcement.

Between 2007 and 2010, Pfizer spent $3.3million on investigations and legal fees and recovered about $5.1million, and had another $5million of pending recoveries from civil lawsuits against makers of counterfeit prescription drugs. Pfizer has hired customs and narcotics experts worldwide to track down fakes and assemble evidence that can be used to pursue civil suits for trademark infringement.

In July 2008, Pfizer announced 275 job cuts at its manufacturing facility in Kalamazoo, Michigan. Kalamazoo was previously the world headquarters of Upjohn Company, which had been acquired as part of Pharmacia.

Acquisitions and mergers 
In June 2000, Pfizer acquired Warner-Lambert outright for $116billion. To satisfy conditions imposed by antitrust regulators at the Federal Trade Commission, Pfizer sold off or transferred stakes in several minor products, including RID (a shampoo for treatment of head lice, sold to Bayer) and Warner-Lambert's antidepressant Celexa (which competes with Zoloft). The acquisition created what was, at the time, the second-largest pharmaceutical company worldwide.

In 2003, Pfizer merged with Pharmacia, and in the process acquired Searle and SUGEN. Searle had developed Flagyl (metronidazole), a nitroimidazole antibiotic medication used particularly for anaerobic bacteria and protozoa. Searle also developed celecoxib (Celebrex) a COX-2 inhibitor and nonsteroidal anti-inflammatory drug (NSAID) used to treat the pain and inflammation in osteoarthritis, acute pain in adults, rheumatoid arthritis, ankylosing spondylitis, painful menstruation, and juvenile rheumatoid arthritis. SUGEN, a company focused on protein kinase inhibitors, had pioneered the use of ATP-mimetic small molecules to block signal transduction. The SUGEN facility was shut down in 2003 by Pfizer, with the loss of more than 300 jobs, and several programs were transferred to Pfizer. These included sunitinib (Sutent), a cancer medication which was approved for human use by the FDA in January 2006. A related compound, SU11654 (Toceranib), was also approved for cancer in dogs, and the ALK inhibitor Crizotinib also grew out of a SUGEN program.

In October 2006, the company announced it would acquire PowerMed.

On October 15, 2009, Pfizer acquired Wyeth for $68billion in cash and stock, including the assumption of debt, making Pfizer the largest pharmaceutical company in the world. The acquisition of Wyeth provided Pfizer with a pneumococcal conjugate vaccine, trademarked Prevnar 13; this is used for the prevention of invasive pneumococcal infections. The introduction of the original, 7-valent version of the vaccine, developed by Wyeth in February 2000, led to a 75% reduction in the incidence of invasive pneumococcal infections among children under age5 in the United States. Pfizer introduced an improved version of the vaccine in 2010, for which it was granted a patent in India in 2017. Prevnar 13 provides coverage of 13 bacterial variants, expanding beyond the original 7-valent version. By 2012, the rate of invasive infections among children under age5 had been reduced by an additional 50%.

2010–2020: Further discoveries and acquisitions 
In 2010, Ian Read was named chief executive officer of the company.

In February 2011, Pfizer announced the closure of its UK research and development facility (formerly also a manufacturing plant) in Sandwich, Kent, which at the time employed 2,400 people. In March 2011, Pfizer acquired King Pharmaceuticals for $3.6billion in cash. King produced emergency injectables such as the EpiPen.

On September 4, 2012, the FDA approved bosutinib (Bosulif) for chronic myelogenous leukemia (CML), a rare type of leukemia and a blood and bone marrow disease that affects primarily older adults. In November 2012, Pfizer received approval from the Food and Drug Administration for Xeljanz, a tofacitinib, for rheumatoid arthritis and ulcerative colitis. The drug had sales of $1.77billion in 2018, and in January 2019, it was the top drug in the United States for direct-to-consumer advertising, passing adalimumab (Humira).

On February 1, 2013, Zoetis, the Agriculture Division of Pfizer and later Pfizer Animal Health, became a public company via an initial public offering, raising $2.2billion. Later in 2013, Pfizer completed the corporate spin-off of its remaining stake in Zoetis.

In September 2014, the company acquired Innopharma for $225million, plus up to $135million in milestone payments, in a deal that expanded Pfizer's range of generic and injectable drugs.

On January 5, 2015, the company announced it would acquire a controlling interest in Redvax, expanding its vaccine portfolio targeting human cytomegalovirus. In February 2015, the company received approval from the Food and Drug Administration for palbociclib (Ibrance) for treatment of certain types of breast cancer. In March 2015, the company announced it would restart its collaboration with Eli Lilly and Company surrounding the Phase III trial of Tanezumab. In May 2015, Pfizer and a Bar-Ilan University laboratory announced a partnership based on the development of medical DNA nanotechnology. In June 2015, the company acquired Nimenrix and Mencevax, meningococcal vaccines, from GlaxoSmithKline for around $130million. In September 2015, Pfizer acquired Hospira for $17billion, including the assumption of debt. Hospira was the largest producer of generic injectable pharmaceuticals in the world. On November 23, 2015, Pfizer and Allergan announced a planned $160billion merger, in the largest pharmaceutical deal ever and the third largest corporate merger in history. The proposed transaction contemplated that the merged company maintain Allergan's Republic of Ireland domicile, resulting in the new company being subject to corporation tax at the relatively low rate of 12.5%. The deal was to constitute a reverse merger, whereby Allergan acquired Pfizer, with the new company then changing its name to "Pfizer, plc". On April 6, 2016, Pfizer and Allergan terminated the merger agreement after the Obama administration and the United States Department of the Treasury introduced new laws intended to limit corporate inversions (the extent to which companies could move their headquarters overseas in order to reduce the amount of taxes they pay).

In June 2016, the company acquired Anacor Pharmaceuticals for $5.2billion, expanding its portfolio in both inflammation and immunology drugs areas. In August 2016, the company made a $40million bid for the assets of BIND Therapeutics, which was in bankruptcy. The same month, the company acquired Bamboo Therapeutics for $645million, expanding its gene therapy offerings. In September 2016, the company acquired cancer drug-maker Medivation for $14billion. In October 2016, the company licensed the anti-CTLA4 monoclonal antibody, ONC-392, from OncoImmune. In November 2016, Pfizer funded a $3,435,600 study with the CDC Foundation to research "screen-and-treat" strategies for cryptococcal disease in Botswana. In December 2016, Pfizer acquired AstraZeneca's small-molecule antibiotics business for $1.575 billion.

In January 2018, Pfizer announced that it would end its work on research into treatments for Alzheimer's disease and Parkinsonism (a symptom of Parkinson's disease and other conditions). The company said about 300 researchers would lose their jobs. In July 2018, the Food and Drug Administration approved enzalutamide, developed by Pfizer and Astellas Pharma for patients with castration-resistant prostate cancer. In August 2018, Pfizer signed an agreement with BioNTech to conduct joint research and development activities regarding mRNA-based influenza vaccines. In October 2018, effective January 1, 2019, Albert Bourla was promoted to chief executive officer, succeeding Ian Read, his mentor.

In July 2019, the company acquired Therachon for up to $810million, expanding its rare disease portfolio through Therachon's recombinant human fibroblast growth factor receptor 3 compound, aimed at treating conditions such as achondroplasia. Also in July, Pfizer acquired Array Biopharma for $10.6billion, boosting its oncology pipeline. In August 2019, Pfizer merged its consumer health business with that of GlaxoSmithKline, into a joint venture owned 68% by GlaxoSmithKline and 32% by Pfizer, with plans to make it a public company. The transaction built on a 2018 transaction where GlaxoSmithKline acquired Novartis' stake in the GSK-Novartis consumer healthcare joint business. The transaction followed negotiations with other companies including Reckitt Benckiser, Sanofi, Johnson & Johnson, and Procter & Gamble. In September 2019, Pfizer initiated a study with the CDC Foundation to investigate the tracking of healthcare-associated infections, scheduled to run through to June 2023. In December 2019, Pfizer awarded the CDC Foundation a further $1,948,482 to continue its cryptococcal disease screening and treatment research in nine African countries.

In September 2020, the company acquired a 9.9% stake in CStone Pharmaceuticals for $200million (HK$1.55billion), helping to commercialise its anti-PD-L1 monoclonal antibody, CS1001. In October 2020, the company acquired Arixa Pharmaceuticals. In November 2020, using a Reverse Morris Trust structure, Pfizer merged its off-patent branded and generic drug business, known as Upjohn, with Mylan to form Viatris, owned 57% by Pfizer shareholders.

2021–onwards: Corporate developments and acquisitions 
On January 5, 2021, Pfizer introduced a new logo. In April 2021, Pfizer acquired Amplyx Pharmaceuticals and its anti-fungal compound fosmanogepix (APX001). In August, the company announced it would acquire Trillium Therapeutics Inc and its immuno-oncology portfolio for $2.3 billion.

In March 2022, the company acquired Arena Pharmaceuticals for $6.7 billion in cash. In June 2022, the company acquired ReViral Ltd, for up to $525 million, gaining access to experimental drugs used to combat respiratory syncytial virus infections.

In October 2022, the company acquired Biohaven Pharma and its calcitonin gene-related peptide programs for $11.6 billion. It also acquired Global Blood Therapeutics for $5.4 billion, boosting Pfizer's rare disease business.

In March 2023, the company agreed to acquire Seagen for a total enterprise value of around $43billion.

Acquisition history

Pfizer (Founded 1849 as Charles Pfizer & Company)
Warner–Lambert
William R. Warner (Founded 1856, merged 1955)
Lambert Pharmacal Company (Merged 1955)
Parke-Davis (Founded 1860, Acq 1976)
Wilkinson Sword (Acq 1993, divested 2003)
Agouron (Acq 1999)
Pharmacia (Acq 2002)
Pharmacia & Upjohn (Merged 2000)
Pharmacia (Merged 1995)
Farmitalia Carlo Erba
Kabi Pharmacia
Pharmacia Aktiebolaget
The Upjohn Company (Merged 1995)
Monsanto (Merged 2000, divested 2002)
Searle (Merged 2000)
Esperion Therapeutics (Acq 2003, divested 2008)
Meridica (Acq 2004)
Vicuron Pharmaceuticals (Acq 2005)
Idun (Acq 2005)
Angiosyn (Acq 2005)
Powermed (Acq 2006)
Rinat (Acq 2006)
Coley Pharmaceutical Group (Acq 2007)
CovX (Acq 2007)
Encysive Pharmaceuticals Inc (Acq 2008)
Wyeth (Acq 2009)
Chef Boyardee (Acq 1946, divested 1996 with food div)	
S.M.A. Corporation
Ayerst Laboratories (Acq 1943)
Fort Dodge Serum Company (Acq 1945)
Bristol-Myers (Animal Health div)
Parke-Davis (Animal Health div)
A.H. Robins
Sherwood Medical (Acq 1982)
Genetics Institute, Inc. (Acq 1992)
American Cyanamid (Acq 1994)
Lederle Laboratories
Solvay (Acq 1995, Animal Health div)
King Pharmaceuticals (Acq 2010)
Monarch Pharmaceuticals, Inc.
King Pharmaceuticals Research and Development, Inc.	
Meridian Medical Technologies, Inc.
Parkedale Pharmaceuticals, Inc.
King Pharmaceuticals Canada Inc.
Monarch Pharmaceuticals Ireland Limited
Synbiotics Corporation (Acq 2011)
Icagen (Acq 2011)
Ferrosan (Consumer Health div, Acq 2011)
Excaliard Pharmaceuticals (Acq 2011)
Alacer Corp (Acq 2012)
NextWave Pharmaceuticals, Inc (Acq 2012)
Innopharma (Acq 2014)
Redvax GmbH (Acq 2014)
Hospira (Spun off from Abbott Laboratories 2004, Acq 2015) 	
Mayne Pharma Ltd (Acq 2007)
Pliva-Croatia	
Orchid Chemicals & Pharmaceuticals Ltd. (Generics & Injectables div, Acq 2009) 	
Javelin Pharmaceuticals, Inc. (Acq 2010)	
TheraDoc (Acq 2010)
Arixa Pharmaceuticals (Acq 2020)
Anacor Pharmaceuticals(Acq 2016)
Bamboo Therapeutics (Acq 2016)
Medivation (Acq 2016)
AstraZeneca (Small molecule antibiotic div, Acq 2016)
Array BioPharma (Acq 2019)
Amplyx Pharmaceuticals (Acq 2021)
Trillium Therapeutics (Acq 2021)
Arena Pharmaceuticals (Acq 2022)
ReViral Ltd (Acq 2022)
Biohaven Pharma (Acq 2022)
Kleo Pharmaceuticals, Inc. (Acq 2021)
Seagen (Acq pending)
Cascadian Therapeutics (Acq 2018)

COVID-19 
Pfizer has developed and launched several products in response to the COVID-19 pandemic, including the Pfizer–BioNTech COVID-19 vaccine and Paxlovid.

In March 2020, Pfizer joined the COVID-19 Therapeutics Accelerator funding vehicle to expedite development of treatments against COVID-19. The $125 million initiative was launched by the Bill & Melinda Gates Foundation in partnership with Mastercard and Wellcome Trust, with additional funding announced shortly after from Chan Zuckerberg Initiative, UK Foreign, Commonwealth and Development Office and Madonna.

The following month, the Foundation for the National Institutes of Health announced the Accelerating COVID-19 Therapeutic Interventions and Vaccines (ACTIV) public-private partnership to develop a coordinated research strategy for prioritizing and speeding up development of COVID-19 vaccines and pharmaceutical products. Pfizer joined the partnership as an industry "leadership organization", and participated as a collaborator in ACTIV-led clinical trials. CEO Albert Bourla attended the GAVI COVAX AMC 2021 Investment Opportunity Launch Event, otherwise named One World Protected, on April 15, 2021.

In Canada, Pfizer endorsed the use of a vaccine passport mobile app developed by CANImmunize in order to record and track status of COVID-19 vaccination.

COVID-19 pandemic and vaccine development

Initial development and testing 
As the scale of the COVID-19 pandemic became apparent, Pfizer partnered with BioNTech to study and develop COVID-19 mRNA vaccine candidates. Unlike many of its competitors, Pfizer took no initial research funds from the United States' Operation Warp Speed vaccine development program, instead choosing to invest roughly $2 billion of its own funds. Pfizer CEO Albert Bourla has said that he declined money from Operation Warp Speed to avoid government intervention, stating later that "when you get money from someone that always comes with strings. They want to see how we are going to progress, what type of moves you are going to do. They want reports. And also, I wanted to keep Pfizer out of politics, by the way."

In May 2020, Pfizer began testing four different COVID-19 vaccine variations using lipid nanoparticle technology provided by Canadian biotechnology company Acuitas Therapeutics. Vaccines were injected into the first human participants in the U.S. in early May. In July 2020, Pfizer and BioNTech announced that two of the partners' four mRNA vaccine candidates had won fast track designation from the FDA. The company began PhaseII-III testing on 30,000 people in the last week of July 2020 and was slated to be paid $1.95billion for 100million doses of the vaccine by the US government. In September 2020, Pfizer and BioNTech announced that they had completed talks with the European Commission to provide an initial 200million vaccine doses to the EU, with the option to supply another 100million doses at a later date.

Efficacy results and authorization 

On November 9, 2020, Pfizer announced that BioNTech's COVID-19 vaccine, tested on 43,500 people, was found to be 90% effective at preventing symptomatic COVID-19. The efficacy was updated to 95% a week later. Akiko Iwasaki, an immunologist interviewed by the New York Times, described the efficacy figure as "really a spectacular number." The announcement made Pfizer and BioNTech the first companies to develop and test a working vaccine for COVID-19.

Over the following month and a half, regulators in various countries approved Pfizer's vaccine for emergency use. The United Kingdom approved the vaccine first, on December 2, followed by Bahrain on December 4, Canada on December 9, and Saudi Arabia on December 10. On December 10, 2020, the United States FDA held an advisory committee meeting to discuss authorization of the vaccine. The next day, the US officially became the 5th country to approve use of Pfizer's vaccine under an Emergency Use Authorization (EUA), with an independent panel voting 17–4 in support of approval. On December 14, Singapore became one of the first in Asia to approve the vaccine through the Health Sciences Authority. On December 21, the European Medicines Agency (EMA) recommended granting a conditional marketing authorisation for the vaccine in the European Union, under the brand name "Comirnaty."

Manufacturing and distribution 

As of early May 2021, Pfizer and BioNTech had manufactured at least 430 million vaccine doses, which have been distributed to 91 countries and territories. The companies have said they expect to manufacture nearly 3 billion total vaccine doses in 2021. Pfizer provided 0.9% Sodium chloride Injection USP diluent for use with the Pfizer–BioNTech COVID-19 vaccine under the name of its subsidiary, Hospira. Pfizer also purchased large quantities of single-use medical and surgical gloves and protective bodysuits from Ansell during the process, contributing to a doubling of the supplier's manufacturing capacity.

Controversy 
In February 2021, after a year long investigation relying on unnamed officials, Pfizer was accused by The Bureau of Investigative Journalism (TBIJ) of employing "high-level bullying" against at least two Latin American countries during negotiations to acquire COVID-19 vaccines, including requesting that the countries put sovereign assets as collateral for payments. According to TBIJ, these negotiation tactics resulted in a months long delay in Pfizer reaching a vaccine agreement with one country and a complete failure to reach agreements with two other countries, including Argentina and Brazil.

On 2 November 2021, TBMJ published an article after obtaining information from a whistleblower from the Ventavia Research Group. Ventavia was hired by Pfizer as a research subcontractor. The company falsified data, unblinded patients, employed inadequately trained vaccinators, and was slow to follow up on adverse events reported in Pfizer's pivotal phase III trial. The regional director, Brook Jackson, emailed a complaint to the US Food and Drug Administration (FDA). Ventavia fired her later the same day. The European Medicines Agency (EMA) stated in a response to the European Parliament, that "the deficiencies identified do not jeopardize the quality and integrity of the data from the main Comirnaty trial and have no impact on the benefit-risk assessment or on the conclusions on the safety, effectiveness and quality of the vaccine".

On 10 October 2022, during a session of the European Parliament's Special Committee on the COVID-19 Pandemic, Pfizer executive Janine Small testified that the company had not evaluated their COVID-19 vaccine for its ability to reduce transmission of the SARS-CoV-2 virus prior to its release to the general public. Dutch MEP Rob Roos described the admission as "scandalous". CEO Albert Bourla was slated to attend, but withdrew. Roos' statements in turn have been described as "misleading".

Development of oral antivirals 
In November 2021, Pfizer launched a new COVID-19 oral antivirus treatment known as Paxlovid. In January 2022, the Pfizer CEO Albert Bourla confirmed that the trial results of a fourth dose were pending until March 2022. He said that the firm was setting up a collaboration to develop an anti-COVID pill treatment along with a French company, Novasep. He also said the COVID vaccine was "safe and efficient" for children. In May 2022, reports emerged of patients experiencing "rebound" symptoms after completing a five-day course of Paxlovid. The FDA responded by announcing they had performed additional analyses of the drug's clinical trial data, and decided against changing its recommendations. U.S. President Joe Biden and Dr. Anthony Fauci were both reported to experience this rebound syndrome in the months that followed, while continuing to recommend the drug for those who may benefit from it.

Legal issues

Aggressive pharmaceutical marketing

Pfizer has been accused of aggressive pharmaceutical marketing.

Illegal marketing of gabapentin for off-label uses
In 1993, the Food and Drug Administration (FDA) approved gabapentin only for treatment of seizures. Warner–Lambert, which merged with Pfizer in 2000, used continuing medical education and medical research, sponsored articles about the drug for the medical literature, and alleged suppression of unfavorable study results, to promote gabapentin. Within five years, the drug was being widely used for off-label uses such as treatment of pain and psychiatric conditions. Warner–Lambert admitted to violating FDA regulations by promoting the drug for pain, psychiatric conditions, migraine, and other unapproved uses. In 2004, the company paid $430million in one of the largest settlements to resolve criminal and civil health care liability charges. It was the first off-label promotion case successfully brought under the False Claims Act. A Cochrane review concluded that gabapentin is ineffective in migraine prophylaxis. The American Academy of Neurology rates it as having unproven efficacy, while the Canadian Headache Society and the European Federation of Neurological Societies rate its use as being supported by moderate and low-quality evidence.

Illegal marketing of Bextra
In September 2009, Pfizer pleaded guilty to the illegal marketing of arthritis drug valdecoxib (Bextra) and agreed to a $2.3billion settlement, the largest health care fraud settlement at that time. Pfizer promoted the sale of the drug for several uses and dosages that the Food and Drug Administration specifically declined to approve due to safety concerns. The drug was pulled from the market in 2005. It was Pfizer's fourth such settlement in a decade. The payment included $1.195billion in criminal penalties for felony violations of the Federal Food, Drug, and Cosmetic Act, and $1.0billion to settle allegations it had illegally promoted the drugs for uses that were not approved by the Food and Drug Administration (FDA) leading to violations under the False Claims Act as reimbursements were requested from Federal and State programs. The criminal fine was the largest ever assessed in the United States to date. Pfizer entered a corporate integrity agreement with the Office of Inspector General that required it to make substantial structural reforms within the company, and publish to its website its post approval commitments and a searchable database of all payments to physicians made by the company.

Termination of Peter Rost
Peter Rost was vice president in charge of the endocrinology division at Pharmacia before its acquisition by Pfizer. During that time he raised concerns internally about kickbacks and off-label marketing of Genotropin, Pharmacia's human growth hormone drug. Pfizer reported the Pharmacia marketing practices to the FDA and Department of Justice; Rost was unaware of this and filed an FCA lawsuit against Pfizer. Pfizer kept him employed, but isolated him until the FCA suit was unsealed in 2005. The Justice Department declined to intervene, and Pfizer fired him, and he filed a wrongful termination suit against Pfizer. Pfizer won a summary dismissal of the case, with the court ruling that the evidence showed Pfizer had decided to fire Rost prior to learning of his whistleblower activities.

Illegal marketing of Rapamune
A "whistleblower suit" was filed in 2005 against Wyeth, which was acquired by Pfizer in 2009, alleging that the company illegally marketed sirolimus (Rapamune) for off-label uses, targeted specific doctors and medical facilities to increase sales of Rapamune, tried to get transplant patients to change from their transplant drugs to Rapamune, and specifically targeted African-Americans. According to the whistleblowers, Wyeth also provided doctors and hospitals that prescribed the drug with kickbacks such as grants, donations, and other money. In 2013, the company pleaded guilty to criminal mis-branding violations under the Federal Food, Drug, and Cosmetic Act. By August 2014, it had paid $491million in civil and criminal penalties related to Rapamune.

Illegal marketing
In June 2010, health insurance network Blue Cross Blue Shield (BCBS) filed a lawsuit against Pfizer for allegedly illegally marketing drugs Bextra, Geodon and Lyrica. BCBS alleged that Pfizer used kickbacks and wrongly persuaded doctors to prescribe the drugs. According to the lawsuit, Pfizer handed out 'misleading' materials on off-label uses, sent over 5,000 doctors on trips to the Caribbean or around the United States, and paid them $2,000 honoraria in return for listening to lectures about Bextra. Despite Pfizer's claims that "the company's intent was pure" in fostering a legal exchange of information among doctors, an internal marketing plan revealed that Pfizer intended to train physicians "to serve as public relations spokespeople." The case was settled in 2014 for $325million. Fearing that Pfizer is "too big to fail" and that prosecuting the company would result in disruptions to Medicare and Medicaid, federal prosecutors instead charged a subsidiary of a subsidiary of a subsidiary of Pfizer, which is "nothing more than a shell company whose only function is to plead guilty."

Removal of ads after unflattering article
According to Harper's Magazine publisher John R. MacArthur, Pfizer withdrew "between $400,000 and a million dollars" worth of ads from Harper's Magazine following an unflattering article on depression medication.

Quigley Company asbestos
The Quigley Company, which sold asbestos-containing insulation products until the early 1970s, was acquired by Pfizer in 1968. In June 2013, asbestos victims and Pfizer negotiated a settlement that required Pfizer to pay a total of $964million: $430million to 80% of existing plaintiffs and place an additional $535million into a settlement trust that will compensate future plaintiffs as well as the remaining 20% of plaintiffs with claims against Pfizer and Quigley. Of that $535million, $405million is in a 40-year note from Pfizer, while $100million is from insurance policies.

Shiley defective heart valves
Pfizer purchased Shiley in 1979, at the onset of its Convexo-Concave valve ordeal, involving the Bjork–Shiley valve. Approximately 500 people died when defective heart valves fractured and, in 1994, Pfizer agreed to pay $10.75million to settle claims by the United States Department of Justice that the company lied to get approval for the valves.

Firing of employee that filed suit
A federal lawsuit was filed by a scientist claiming she got an infection by a genetically modified lentivirus while working for Pfizer, resulting in intermittent paralysis. A judge dismissed the case citing a lack of evidence that the illness was caused by the virus but the jury ruled that by firing the employee, Pfizer violated laws protecting freedom of speech and whistleblowers and awarded her $1.37million.

Celebrex intellectual property
Brigham Young University (BYU) said a professor of chemistry, Dr. Daniel L. Simmons, discovered an enzyme in the 1990s that led towards development of Celebrex. BYU was originally seeking a 15% royalty on sales, equating to $9.7billion. A research agreement had been made between BYU and Monsanto, whose pharmaceutical business was later acquired by Pfizer, to develop a better aspirin. The enzyme Dr. Simmons claims to have discovered would induce pain and inflammation while causing gastrointestinal problems and Celebrex is used to reduce those issues. A six-year battle ensued because BYU claimed that Pfizer did not give Dr. Simmons credit or compensation, while Pfizer claimed that it had met all obligations regarding the Monsanto agreement. In May 2012, Pfizer settled the allegations, agreeing to pay $450million.

Nigeria Trovafloxacin lawsuit

In 1996, an outbreak of measles, cholera, and bacterial meningitis occurred in Nigeria. Pfizer representatives and personnel from a contract research organization (CRO) traveled to Kano to set up a clinical trial and administer an experimental antibiotic, trovafloxacin, to approximately 200 children. Local Kano officials reported that more than fifty children died in the experiment, while many others developed mental and physical deformities. The nature and frequency of both fatalities and other adverse outcomes were similar to those historically found among pediatric patients treated for meningitis in sub-Saharan Africa. In 2001, families of the children, as well as the governments of Kano and Nigeria, filed lawsuits regarding the treatment. According to Democracy Now!, "[r]esearchers did not obtain signed consent forms, and medical personnel said Pfizer did not tell parents their children were getting the experimental drug." The lawsuits also accused Pfizer of using the outbreak to perform unapproved human testing, as well as allegedly under-dosing a control group being treated with traditional antibiotics in order to skew the results of the trial in favor of Trovan. Nigerian medical personnel as well as at least one Pfizer physician said the trial was conducted without regulatory approval.

In 2007, Pfizer published a Statement of Defense letter. The letter stated that the drug's oral form was safer and easier to administer, that Trovan had been used safely in more than five thousand Americans prior to the Nigerian trial, that mortality in the patients treated by Pfizer was lower than that observed historically in African meningitis epidemics, and that no unusual side effects, unrelated to meningitis, were observed after four weeks.

In June 2010, the US Supreme Court rejected Pfizer's appeal against a ruling allowing lawsuits by the Nigerian families to proceed.

In December 2010, a United States diplomatic cables leak was released by WikiLeaks indicating that Pfizer hired investigators to find evidence of corruption against Nigerian attorney general Aondoakaa to persuade him to drop legal action. The Washington Post reporter Joe Stephens, who helped break the story in 2000, called these actions "dangerously close to blackmail". In response, the company released a press statement describing the allegations as "preposterous" and saying that it acted in good faith. Aondoakka, who had allegedly demanded bribes from Pfizer in return for a settlement of the case, was declared unfit for office and had his U.S. visa revoked in association with corruption charges in 2010.

The lawsuits were eventually settled out of court. Pfizer committed to paying US$35 million "to compensate the families of children in the study", another US$30 million to "support healthcare initiatives in Kano", and 10 million to cover legal costs. Payouts began in 2011.

Inflating Prices
In July 2022, UK antitrust authorities fined Pfizer £63 million for unfairly high priced drug that aids in controlling epileptic seizures. The Competition and Markets Authority stated that the company took advantage of loopholes by de-branding epilepsy drug Epanutin, by doing so the price of Epanutin's price was not regulated to the same standards the company are used to and therefore the price of the drug was raised. It was stated that over a four-year period, Pfizer had billed Epanutin for around 780% and 1,600% higher than its standard price.

Allegations of patent infringement on mRNA technology

In August 2022, Moderna announced that it will sue Pfizer and its partner BioNTech for infringing their patent on the mRNA technology.

Environmental record
Since 2000, the company has implemented more than 4,000 greenhouse gas reduction projects.

In 2012, the company was named to the Carbon Disclosure Project's Carbon Leadership Index in recognition of its efforts to reduce greenhouse gas emissions.

Pfizer has inherited Wyeth's liabilities in the American Cyanamid site in Bridgewater Township, New Jersey, a highly toxic EPA Superfund site. Pfizer has since attempted to remediate this land in order to clean and develop it for future profits and potential public uses. The Sierra Club and the Edison Wetlands Association have opposed the cleanup plan, arguing that the area is subject to flooding, which could cause pollutants to leach. The EPA considers the plan the most reasonable from considerations of safety and cost-effectiveness, arguing that an alternative plan involving trucking contaminated soil off site could expose cleanup workers. The EPA's position is backed by the environmental watchdog group CRISIS.

In June 2002, a chemical explosion at the Groton plant injured 7 people and caused the evacuation of more than 100 homes in the surrounding area.

Public-private engagement
Pfizer engages with the public and private sectors in a variety of settings including to promote research and development, academic funding, event sponsorship, philanthropy, and political lobbying.

Academia 

 Institute for Advanced Study - Matching gifts and direct donor.
 University of Toronto - Donor to the Boundless Campaign, and member of the President's Circle.
 University of Washington - Member of the Honor Roll of Donors, having contributed between $10 million and $50 million to funding the school as of 2020.

Activism 
 Habitat for Humanity - Donor.
 Human Rights Campaign (HRC) - Corporate partner. HRC is a large LGBT civil rights activism group.
 National Women's Law Center - Donor.
 Share Our Strength - Donor.
 WaterAid - Partner.

Conferences and summits 

 Women in Medicine Summit - Sponsor.
 World Neuroscience Innovation Forum - Strategic partner.

Media 
During the COVID-19 pandemic, Pfizer engaged many forms of media to promote their COVID-19 vaccine, including a commissioned National Geographic documentary. Pfizer is also a donor to the National Geographic Society.

Pfizer was a prominent sponsor of the 2022 Oscars ceremony alongside BioNTech.

Pfizer has been a major donor to the National Press Foundation. Pfizer sponsored a program for the NPF called "Cancer Issues 2010" to train journalists to "understand the latest research" on various cancers, including the role of pharmaceutical products and vaccines. MicroRNA (miRNA) was also a listed topic.

Pfizer sponsors 19 to Zero, a "coalition of academics, public health experts, behavioural economists, and creative professionals" that develops media and educational materials to influence public perception surrounding COVID-19 and COVID-19 vaccines.

Medical societies 

 American Society of Hematology - Sponsor.
 Arthritis Society - National partner. Pfizer also supports the organization's provincial branches in Alberta, British Columbia, Manitoba, New Brunswick, Newfoundland and Labrador, Nova Scotia, Ontario, Prince Edward Island, and Quebec.
 Canadian Cancer Society - Sponsor.
 Canadian Paediatric Society - Funding. CPS is the organization that administers the Canadian Immunization Monitoring Program, Active (IMPACT) vaccine safety program.
 Canadian Society of Internal Medicine - Annual conference sponsor with Bristol Myers Squibb.
 Endocrine Society - Corporate Liaison Board member.
 European Society of Cardiology - Sponsor of the EURObservational Research Programme.
 Spanish Cardiac Society - Strategic partner.

Political lobbying 
Pfizer is affiliated with a variety of industry organizations engaging in political lobbying, and has made substantial direct donations to government and regulatory agencies:

 Adult Vaccine Access Coalition - Member.
 Alliance for a Stronger FDA - Member.
 AMR Industry Alliance - Member.
 BIOTECanada - Member company.
 Bipartisan Policy Center - Donor.
 The Business Council - Member, represented by CEO Albert Bourla.
 Business Council for the United Nations - Member.
 Center on Budget and Policy Priorities - Funder.
 Community Anti-Drug Coalitions of America (CADCA) - Partner.
 COVID-19 Vaccine Education and Equity Project - Sponsor.
 European Federation of Pharmaceutical Industries and Associations - Member.
 Foundation for the National Institutes of Health (FNIH) - Donor. Pfizer has given between $5,000,000 and $9,999,999 to the between 1997 and 2020, contributing to funding the activities of the National Institutes of Health.
 Global Health Council - Member.
 Immunisation Coalition (Australia) - Sponsor.
 Innovative Medicines Canada - Member. IMC is an association of pharmaceutical companies doing business in Canada. The group lobbies the Government of Ontario and House of Commons of Canada through Rubicon Strategy, a firm owned by Progressive Conservative Party of Ontario campaign manager Kory Teneycke.
 International Federation of Pharmaceutical Manufacturers & Associations (IFPMA) - Member.
 Life Sciences British Columbia (LSBC) - Member company and Platinum Sponsor.
 National Health Council (NHC) - Member organization. NHC is a non-profit organization that lobbies the U.S. Government on issues related to healthcare reform.
 National Pharmaceutical Council (NPC) - Member company.
 Personalized Medicine Coalition (PMC) - Member.
 Pharmaceutical Advertising Advisory Board (PAAB) - Client.
 Pharmaceutical Research and Manufacturers of America (PhRMA) - Member company.
 Reagan-Udall Foundation for the Food and Drug Administration - Donor.
 Research!America - Member organization.
 U.S. Global Leadership Coalition - Member.
 World Economic Forum - Member organization.

Scott Gottlieb, who resigned as FDA commissioner in April 2019, joined the Pfizer board of directors three months later, in July 2019.

Pfizer lobbied various officials in the Government of British Columbia between April and November 2012, including then-premier Christy Clark, future premier John Horgan, future health minister Adrian Dix, and future deputy premier, minister of public safety and solicitor general Mike Farnworth. The disclosed purpose was to "provide health policy and pharmaceutical information and communications on behalf of Pfizer Canada," and "learn and understand the budgetary, policy and strategic directions of the Government."

Professional associations 

 Bioscience Association Manitoba (BAM) - Sponsor.
 British Columbia Pharmacy Association (BCPA) - Event sponsor.
 Canadian Association for Clinical Microbiology and Infectious Diseases (CACMID) - Patron (former).
 Canadian Association of Emergency Physicians (CAEP) - Corporate partner.
 Canadian Association of Medical Oncologists - Annual meeting sponsor.
 Canadian Medical Association - Sponsor. In 2009, Pfizer partnered with the CMA to launch a continuing medical education course for physicians.
 Canadian Pharmacists Association and Canadian Pharmacists Journal - Sponsor.
 Canadian Public Health Association - Sponsor.
 Canadian Rheumatology Association - Sponsor.
 Canadian Urological Association - Sponsor.
 Ontario Medical Association (OMA) - Donor to the Ontario Medical Foundation.
 Pharmacy Association of Nova Scotia - Sponsor.

Public health 
Pfizer has engaged in a number of public health and global health initiatives worldwide, and provides funding for health care facilities of various specialties in Canada and the United States:

 CANImmunize - Endorsing partner. CANImmunize is a vaccine passport software company funded primarily by the Public Health Agency of Canada, and partnered with governments, health agencies, academia and pharmaceutical companies across Canada.
 Centre for Addiction and Mental Health - Donor.
 Dana–Farber Cancer Institute - Donor.
 Federation of Medical Women of Canada - Sponsor.
 Food Allergy Canada - Corporate partner, providing funding and advocacy support.
 Hospital for Sick Children (SickKids) - Donor to the SickKids Foundation.
 Medical Teams International - Corporate donor.
 North Bay Regional Health Center - Donor to the NBRHC Foundation.
 Princess Margaret Cancer Centre (PMCC) - Conference sponsor, and donor to the Princess Margaret Cancer Foundation.
 Scarborough Health Network (SHN) - Donor to the SHN Foundation. 
 Sinai Health Foundation - Donor. The foundation funds Mount Sinai Hospital, Bridgepoint Active Healthcare, and the Lunenfeld-Tanenbaum Research Institute in Toronto, Ontario. 
 Sunnybrook Health Sciences Centre - Donor. 
 University Hospitals Kingston Foundation - Donor. UHKF raises funds for the Kingston Health Sciences Centre and Providence Care. 
 William Osler Health System - Event sponsor.
Pfizer sponsored a presentation in January 2020 delivered by Julie Bettinger through British Columbia's Provincial Health Services Authority (PHSA) titled "Vaccine hesitancy: It doesn't matter if the vaccine works if nobody gets it."

In 2020, Pfizer provided funding in the range of $100,000.00 - $250,000.00 to Ronald McDonald House Charities “to provide resources that directly improve the health and well-being of children and their families.”

Research and development 
Pfizer has partnered with and sponsored many medical research networks and professional associations in the United States, Canada and globally:

 ABC Global Alliance - Main sponsor. The alliance is a Portuguese not-for-profit society supporting research into advanced breast cancer.
 Accelerating COVID-19 Therapeutic Interventions and Vaccines (ACTIV) - Industry partner.
 AdvaMed - Member (former).
 Alliance for Regenerative Medicine - Member organization. The alliance is an international advocacy organization supporting the development of regenerative medicines including gene therapy and stem-cell therapy.
 Arthritis Australia - Donor.
 BioFIT - Sponsor. BioFIT holds events to connect academia, pharmaceutical companies, and investors in the field of life sciences and biotechnology.
 Canadian Frailty Network - Industry partner. CFN has provided research grants related to COVID-19.
 Colorectal Cancer Canada - Sponsor.
 Drugs for Neglected Diseases Initiative - Partner. DNDI is a non-profit drug research and development organization that expedites creation and delivery of medicines for diseases including leishmaniasis, sleeping sickness, and hepatitis C.
 GISAID - Funding for COVID-19 operations.
 Heart and Stroke Foundation of Canada - National corporate partner and sponsor.
 Lung Health Foundation - Partner. Funds research into infectious lung disease and lobbying for policy changes.
 Mentoring in IBD - Sponsor. Annual educational program for Canadian gastroenterologists.
 Mount Sinai Hospital (Toronto) - Sponsor for research into infectious diseases such as COVID-19 through educational grants.
 Nova Scotia Chronic Pain Collaborative Care Network - Investment in Canadian health research.
 Ontario Hospital Research Institute (OHRI) - Research grants.
 Pinnacle Research Group - Sponsor.
 Radcliffe Cardiology - Industry partner.
 Truth Initiative - Featured partner. The initiative performs research and policy studies related to the reduction of tobacco use in youth.

See also

 Biotech and pharmaceutical companies in the New York metropolitan area
 Companies of the United States with untaxed profits
 Fire in the Blood (2013 film)
 List of pharmaceutical companies

References

External links

 Pfizer Inc. recipient profile on USAspending.gov

 
1849 establishments in New York (state)
1940s initial public offerings
American brands
American companies established in 1849
Biotechnology companies of the United States
Clinical trial organizations
Companies based in Manhattan
Companies listed on the New York Stock Exchange
Companies listed on the Bombay Stock Exchange
Former components of the Dow Jones Industrial Average
Life sciences industry
Multinational companies based in New York City
Orphan drug companies
Pharmaceutical companies established in 1849
Pharmaceutical companies of the United States
Publicly traded companies based in New York City
Research and development in the United States
Vaccine producers
COVID-19 vaccine producers